The eleventh season of RuPaul's Drag Race aired on VH1 from February 28, 2019, to May 30, 2019. The cast featured fourteen new queens and one returning queen, making it the largest cast of the series at the time; the contestants were announced in a live stream hosted by season 10 winner Aquaria and Adam Rippon on January 24, 2019. 

The winner of the eleventh season of RuPaul's Drag Race was Yvie Oddly, with Brooke Lynn Hytes being the runner-up, and Nina West being Miss Congeniality. Season 10 contestant Vanessa Vanjie Mateo returned to the competition, placing 5th.  At the time of release Season 11 featured the largest cast in the franchise, with fifteen queens competing. This was later outperformed by Season 15, with sixteen queens competing.

Contestants

Ages, names, and cities stated are at time of filming.

Notes:

Contestant progress

Lip syncs
Legend:

Guest judges
Listed in chronological order:

Miley Cyrus, singer, actress
Bobby Moynihan, actor, comedian
Sydelle Noel, actress, athlete
Guillermo Díaz, actor
Troye Sivan, singer, songwriter
Joel McHale, actor, comedian
Tiffany Pollard, reality television personality
Cara Delevingne, model, actress
Elvira, Mistress of the Dark, actress, television hostess
Mirai Nagasu, figure skater
Adam Rippon, figure skater
Travis Wall, dancer, choreographer
Kandi Burruss, singer, songwriter, reality television personality
Amber Valletta, model, actress
Clea DuVall, actress
Tony Hale, actor
Fortune Feimster, actress, comedian
Cheyenne Jackson, actor, singer
Natasha Lyonne, actress
Katherine Langford, actress
Gina Rodriguez, actress
Wanda Sykes, actress, comedian, writer
Lena Waithe, writer, actress
Todrick Hall, singer, director, choreographer & Former RuPaul's Drag Race All Stars Judge

Special guests
Guests who appeared in episodes, but did not judge on the main stage.

Episode 1
Adore Delano, runner-up of season six and contestant on All Stars 2 season two
Delta Work, contestant on season three
Derrick Barry, contestant on season eight and contestant on All Stars season five
Eureka, contestant on season nine and runner-up of season ten, runner-up on All Stars season six
Farrah Moan, contestant on season nine and All Stars season four
Ginger Minj, runner-up of season seven, contestant on All Stars season two, runner-up on All Stars season six
Jasmine Masters, contestant on season seven and All Stars season four
Kimora Blac, contestant on season nine
Manila Luzon, runner-up of season three and contestant on All Stars season one and season four
Mariah Balenciaga, contestant on season three and contestant on All Stars season five
Ongina, contestant on season one and contestant on All Stars season five
Raja, winner of season three
Raven, runner-up of season two and All Stars season one
Kylie Sonique Love, contestant on season two and winner on season six of All Stars
Victoria "Porkchop" Parker, contestant on season one

Episode 2
Derrick Barry, contestant on season eight and contestant on All Stars 5 season five

Episode 4
Rachel Maddow, journalist, political commentator
Yanis Marshall, French choreographer and dancer
Ginger Minj, runner-up of season seven, contestant on All Stars season two, runner-up on  All Stars season six

Episode 5
Trixie Mattel, contestant on season seven and winner of All Stars 3 season 3

Episode 6
Love Connie, drag performer

Episode 7
Alyssa Edwards, contestant on season five and All Stars season 2

Episode 8
Jinkx Monsoon, winner of season five and winner of All Stars season 7
Morgan McMichaels, contestant on season two and All Stars season three

Episode 10
Delta Work, contestant on season three
Kyle Marlett, magician
Raven, runner up on season 2 and All Stars season 1

Episode 11
Shuga Cain, contestant on season eleven 
Plastique Tiara, contestant on season eleven 
Scarlet Envy, contestant on season eleven 
Ariel Versace, contestant on season eleven
Honey Davenport, contestant on season eleven 
Soju, contestant on season eleven 

Episode 14
Christine and the Queens, French singer

Episodes

Ratings

References

2019 American television seasons
2019 in LGBT history
RuPaul's Drag Race seasons